Como (or  ; ;) is a city and comune in Lombardy, Italy. It is the administrative capital of the Province of Como.

Its proximity to Lake Como and to the Alps has made Como a tourist destination, and the city contains numerous works of art, churches, gardens, museums, theatres, parks, and palaces: the Duomo, seat of the Diocese of Como; the Basilica of Sant'Abbondio; the Villa Olmo; the public gardens with the Tempio Voltiano; the Teatro Sociale; the Broletto or the city's medieval town hall; and the 20th-century Casa del Fascio.

Como was the birthplace of many historical figures, including the poet Caecilius mentioned by Catullus in the first century BCE, writers Pliny the Elder and Pliny the Younger, Pope Innocent XI, scientist Alessandro Volta, and Cosima Liszt, second wife of Richard Wagner and long-term director of the Bayreuth Festival, and Antonio Sant'Elia (1888–1916), a futurist architect and a pioneer of the modern movement.

History

The hills surrounding the current location of Como were inhabited, since at least the Iron Age, by a Celtic tribe known as the Orobii. Remains of settlements are still present on the wood-covered hills to the southwest of town.

Around the first century BC, the territory became subject to the Romans. The town center was situated on the nearby hills, but it was then moved to its current location by order of Julius Caesar, who had the swamp near the southern tip of the lake drained and laid the plan of the walled city in the typical Roman grid of perpendicular streets. The newly founded town was named Novum Comum and had the status of municipium. In September 2018, Culture Minister Alberto Bonisoli announced the discovery of several hundred gold coins in the basement of the former Cressoni Theater (Teatro Cressoni) in a two-handled soapstone amphora, coins struck by emperors Honorius, Valentinian III, Leo I the Thracian, Antonio and Libius Severus dating to 474 AD.

In 774, the town surrendered to invading Franks led by Charlemagne, and became a center of commercial exchange.

In 1127, Como lost a decade-long war with the nearby town of Milan. A few decades later, with the help of Frederick Barbarossa, the Comaschi were able to avenge their defeat when Milan was destroyed in 1162. Frederick promoted the construction of several defensive towers around the city limits, of which only one, the Baradello, remains.

Subsequently, the history of Como followed that of the Duchy of Milan, through the French invasion and the Spanish domination, until 1714, when the territory was taken by the Austrians. Napoleon descended into Lombardy in 1796 and ruled it until 1815, when the Austrian rule was resumed after the Congress of Vienna. By 1848, the population had reached 16,000. In 1859, with the arrival of Giuseppe Garibaldi, the town became part of the newly formed Kingdom of Italy under the House of Savoy.

At the end of World War II, after passing through Como on his escape towards Switzerland, Benito Mussolini was taken prisoner and then shot by partisans in Giulino di Mezzegra, a small town on the north shores of Lake Como.

In 2010, a motion by members of the nationalist Swiss People's Party  was submitted to the Swiss parliament requesting the admission of adjacent territories to the Swiss Confederation; Como (and its province) is one of these.

The Rockefeller fountain that today stands in the Bronx Zoo in New York City was once in the main square (Piazza Cavour) by the lakeside. It was bought by William Rockefeller in 1902 for Lire 3,500 (the estimated equivalent then of $637).

Geography
Nearby major cities are Varese, Lecco, and Lugano.

Climate

According to the Köppen climate classification, Como has a humid subtropical climate (Cfa); winters are not long but present occasional periods of frost from the Siberian Anticyclone; spring and autumn are well marked and pleasant, while summer can be quite oppressive, hot, and humid. Wind is quite rare; only sudden bursts of foehn or thunderstorms manage to sweep the air clean. Pollution levels rise significantly in winter when cold air clings to the soil. Rain is more frequent during spring; summer is subject to thunderstorms and occasionally hailstorms.

Government
The legislative body of the Italian comuni is the City Council (Consiglio Comunale); in Como it comprises 32 councillors elected every five years with a proportional system, at the same time of the mayoral elections. The executive body is the City Committee (Giunta Comunale), composed by 9 assessori each overseeing a specific ministry, that is nominated and presided over by a directly elected Mayor (Sindaco). The mayor of Como since June 27, 2022, is Alessandro Rapinese, an independent leading an alliance bearing his name (Rapinese Sindaco), unaffiliated to any official political party.

Administrative subdivisions

Como is divided into these  (roughly equivalent to the anglocentric ward):

 Albate – Muggiò – Acquanera
 Lora
 Prestino – Camerlata – Breccia – Rebbio
 Camnago Volta
 City Center – West Como
 Borghi
 North Como – East Como
 Monte Olimpino – Ponte Chiasso – Sagnino – Tavernola
 Garzola – Civiglio

Main sights

Churches

Como Cathedral: Construction began in 1396 on the site of the previous Romanesque church of Santa Maria Maggiore. The façade was built in 1457, with the characteristic rose window and a portal flanked by two Renaissance statues of the famous comaschi Pliny the Elder and Pliny the Younger. The construction was finished in 1740. The interior is on the Latin cross plan, with Gothic nave and two aisles divided by piers, while the transept wing and the relative apses are from the Renaissance age. It includes a carved 16th century choir and tapestries on cartoons by Giuseppe Arcimboldi. The dome is a rococo structure by Filippo Juvarra. Other artworks include 16th–17th century tapestries and 16th century paintings by Bernardino Luini and Gaudenzio Ferrari.
San Fedele, a Romanesque church erected around 1120 over a pre-existing central plan edifice. The original bell tower was rebuilt in modern times. The main feature is the famous Door of St. Fedele, carved with medieval decorations.
Sant'Agostino, built by the Cistercians in the early 14th century, heavily renovated in the 20th. The interior and adjoining cloister have 15th–17th century frescoes, but most of the decoration is Baroque.
Basilica of Sant'Abbondio, a Romanesque structure consecrated in 1095 by Pope Urban II. The interior, with a nave and four aisles, contains paintings dating to the 11th century and frescoes from the 14th.
San Carpoforo (11th century, apse and crypt from 12th century). According to tradition, it was founded re-using a former temple of the God Mercury to house the remains of Saint Carpophorus and other local martyrs.

Secular buildings and monuments
The ancient town hall, known as the Broletto
Casa del Fascio, possibly Giuseppe Terragni's most famous work. It has been described as an early "landmark of modern European architecture".
Monumento ai caduti (war memorial) by Giuseppe Terragni
Teatro Sociale by Giuseppe Cusi in 1813
Villa Olmo, built from 1797 in neoclassicist style by the Odescalchi family. It housed Napoleon, Ugo Foscolo, Prince Metternich, Archduke Franz Ferdinand I, Giuseppe Garibaldi, and other eminent figures. It is now a seat of exhibitions.
Monumental Fountain also known as "Volta's Fountain", a monument to Volta's battery; it was designed by architect Carlo Cattaneo and painter Mario Radice and is a  cement combination of alternating spheres and rings. It is in the center of Camerlata square.
Ancient walls (medieval)
 the Tempio Voltiano, a museum dedicated to Alessandro Volta, a famous Comasco engineer, physicist, and inventor
 the Life Electric, a modern sculpture made by Daniel Libeskind
 Castello Baradello, a small medieval castle overlooking the town and which is all that remains of the fortress constructed by Barbarossa c. 1158

Economy
The economy of Como, until the end of the 1980s, was traditionally based on industry; in particular, the city was world-famous for its silk manufacturers, and in 1972 its production exceeded that of China and Japan, but since the mid-1990s increasing competition from Asia has significantly reduced profit margins and many small and mid-sized firms have gone out of business. As a consequence manufacturing is no longer the economic driver, and the city has been absorbed into Milan's metropolitan area where it mainly provides workers to the service industry sector. A significant number of residents are employed in the nearby Swiss towns Lugano and Mendrisio, primarily in the industrial sector, health care services and in the hospitality industry; the  commute is beneficial as wages in Switzerland are notably higher. For these reasons, tourism has become increasingly important for the city's economy since the late 1990s, when local small businesses have gradually been replaced by bars, restaurants and hotels. With 215,320 overnight guests in 2013, Como was the fourth-most visited city in Lombardy after Milan, Bergamo, and Brescia. In 2018, Como surpassed Bergamo becoming the third most visited city in Lombardy with 1.4 million arrivals. The city and the lake have been chosen as the filming location for various recent popular feature films, and this, together with the increasing presence of celebrities such as Matt Bellamy who have bought lakeside properties, has heightened the city's attractiveness and given a further boost to international tourism; since the early 2000s the city has become a popular "must see" tourist destination in Italy.

Demographics
The city of Como has seen its population count increase until it peaked at almost 100,000 inhabitants in the 1970s, when manufacturing, especially the silk industry, was in its boom years. As production began to decline, the population tally decreased by almost 20,000 until the beginning of the 21st century, when the city saw its population grow again by more than six thousand units, generally due to increasing immigration from Asia, Eastern Europe and North Africa. As of October 2022, the population was 84,250 people of which 11,921 were resident aliens, that is, 14.1% of the total; the population distribution by origin was as follows:

Top 20 nationalities of resident aliens:

Culture

Museums
In Como there are the following museums and exhibition centers:
Museo Archeologico "P. Giovio" – archeological museum
Garibaldi Museum (Como) – a museum dedicated to Giuseppe Garibaldi
Tempio Voltiano – a museum devoted to Alessandro Volta's work
Villa Olmo – various exhibitions
Museo Didattico Della Seta – educational silk museum
Museo Liceo classico "A. Volta" – scientific museum
Pinacoteca Civica – paintings and artworks from Carolingian to modern era housed in the 17th-century Palazzo Volpi

Cuisine

Polenta is a popular dish in Como, and was traditionally eaten for meals in winter time. It is obtained by mixing and cooking corn flour and buckwheat. It is usually served with meat, game, cheese and sometimes fish; in fact, Polenta e Misultin (Alosa agone) is served in the restaurants in the Lake Como area.

A traditional dish is the Risotto con Filetti di Pesce Persico or simply Risotto al Pesce Persico (European perch filet risotto), a fish grown in Lake Como, prepared with white wine, onion, butter and wheat.

Transportation

Rail
The Servizio Ferroviario Regionale (Regional Railway Service) connects Como by train to other major cities in Lombardy. Services are provided by Trenord through two main stations: Como San Giovanni and Como Nord Lago. There are five more urban stations (Albate-Camerlata, Albate-Trecallo, Como Borghi, Como Camerlata and Grandate-Breccia).

Como San Giovanni is also a stop on the main north–south line between Milan Centrale and Zürich HB and Basel SBB. Intercity and EuroCity trains stop at this station, which makes Como very accessible from the European express train network.

Buses and taxis
The local public transport network comprises 11 urban (within city limits) lines and 'extra-urban' (crossing city limits) (C) lines connecting Como with most of its province centers. They are provided by ASF Autolinee.

Ferrovie Nord Milano also provides other bus lines connecting Como to Varese in substitution of the original railway line that was dismissed in the 1960s.

A taxi service is provided by the Municipality of Como.

Ship transport
The boats and hydrofoils (aliscafi) of Navigazione Lago di Como connect the town with most of the villages sitting on the shores of the lake.

Airports
Nearby airports providing scheduled flights are Malpensa, Milano Linate and Orio al Serio International Airport; Lugano Agno, in Switzerland, only offers direct flights to Switzerland and Italy and generally higher-priced business class or private jets.

Aero Club

Como is home to the oldest seaplane operation in the world, the Aero Club Como (ICAO code LILY), with a fleet consisting of four seaplanes, used for flight training and local tour flights and four classic seaplanes of historical interest, a 1961 Cessna O-1 Bird Dog, a 1946 Republic RC-3 Seabee a 1947 Macchi M.B.308 idro and a perfectly restored 1935 Caproni Ca.100. A big hangar right next to the lake houses the club's fleet and is also used for aircraft maintenance and servicing.

Education and health
Como is home to numerous high schools, the Conservatory of music "Giuseppe Verdi", the Design school "Aldo Galli", the University of Insubria and a branch campus of the Politecnico di Milano.

In Como there are three major hospitals: Ospedale Sant'Anna, Ospedale Valduce and Clinica Villa Aprica.

Sports
Notable sports clubs are the ASDG Comense 1872 basketball team, two-time winner of the FIBA EuroLeague Women, and Calcio Como, a football team. There are also numerous recreational activities available for tourists such as pedal-boating, fishing, walking and seaplane rentals. Como also hosts a prestigious clay-court tennis tournament every year, the Città di Como Challenger, which attracts many of the world's top players who are not involved in the concurrent US Open. Many players have testified that they much prefer playing in the relaxed and friendly Como environs than the hustle and bustle of Flushing Meadows–Corona Park.

International relations

Como is twinned with:
 Fulda, Germany, since 1960
 Tokamachi, Japan, since 1975
 Nablus, Palestine, since 1998
 Netanya, Israel, since 2004

See also
 Lake Como
 Province of Como
 List of people from Como

Notes

Sources

External links

Official website 
Official Tourism Portal
Historical picture gallery and slideshow
Official Tourist Board website 
Lake Como Navigation Company
Official Virtual Tour
A documentary about the Lake by Yann Arthus-Bertrand

 
Cities and towns in Lombardy
Roman towns and cities in Italy
Populated places established in the 1st century BC
Italy–Switzerland border